Bradley James "Dez" Fafara (born May 12, 1966) is an American heavy metal vocalist who performs in the bands DevilDriver and Coal Chamber.

Early life

Fafara is of Portuguese and Sicilian descent. His father, Tiger Fafara, and his late uncle, Stanley Fafara, were child actors on the Leave It to Beaver television sitcom.

He has had attention deficit hyperactivity disorder his whole life.

Fafara adopted the nickname "Dez" in honor of Dez Cadena, vocalist and guitarist for Black Flag and an early influence on Fafara.

Career

Coal Chamber

Fafara released a total of 5 albums with Coal Chamber. Four of the albums, Coal Chamber (1997), which went gold, Chamber Music (1999), and Dark Days (2002), consisted of new material. An album of remixes, rarities, and b-sides, titled Giving the Devil His Due (2003) and a "Best Of" (2004) were also released. Coal Chamber disbanded in 2003, shortly after Fafara formed his current band DevilDriver.

On September 26, 2011, it was announced that Coal Chamber would reunite for Australia's Soundwave Festival, which took place in early 2012. As of October 2012, according to Fafara, new material from Coal Chamber is in the works.

Coal Chamber participated in a tour with Sevendust and Stolen Babies in early 2013.

According to Fafara, the fourth album was completed in December 2014 before its release in 2015. Coal Chamber now is disbanded and last consisted of the three founding members; Fafara, Miguel Rascon and Mikey Cox, with bassist Nadja Peulen rejoining the band in 2013, having originally played with Coal Chamber in 1999 and 2002. The band collaborated with Ministry's Al Jourgensen for their fourth studio album, titled 'Rivals'.

DevilDriver

Currently, Fafara, as part of DevilDriver, has released seven studio albums, DevilDriver (2003), The Fury of Our Maker's Hand (2005), The Last Kind Words (2007), Pray for Villains (2009), Beast (2011), Winter Kills (2013), Trust No One (2016), Outlaws 'til the End: Vol. 1 (2018) and Dealing with Demons I (2020). DevilDriver was also nominated for a Golden Gods Award in 2008 for the best break-through metal band.

Collaborations

Fafara has appeared on more than twelve soundtrack records, including Scream 3: The Album, which also went gold. He also collaborated with Ozzy Osbourne for a remake of "Shock the Monkey", a song originally by Peter Gabriel, that was released on the Coal Chamber album Chamber Music. This song propelled this record to debut 22 on the Billboard charts upon release.

Fafara recorded and provided vocals for the song "Baptized in the Redemption" on Roadrunner Records' 25th anniversary compilation album Roadrunner United, alongside Dino Cazares (Fear Factory), Andreas Kisser (Sepultura), Paul Gray (Slipknot) and Roy Mayorga (Stone Sour, ex-Soulfly). Dez worked with Nikki Sixx (Mötley Crüe) on a song called "Where Is God Tonight?"

In November 2011, it was announced that Fafara would appear on a track in Soulfly's eighth studio album. The album is titled Enslaved and was released on March 13; the song Fafara appears in is called "Redemption of Man by God." In 2012, he performed on the song "Bastards!" by Canadian hardcore band Cancer Bats on their album Dead Set on Living.

Personal life
Fafara's wife is named Anahstasia, and she appears on the cover of the second Coal Chamber album Chamber Music. Fafara has three sons: Tyler (born 1991), Kaleb (born 1994) and Simon (born 1997). "Tyler's Song", from the album Chamber Music, was written for Tyler. Simon, age nine at the time, added backing growls on DevilDriver's third album, The Last Kind Words (2007), on the song "Tirades of Truth", during the last two lines of the chorus.

Fafara is a vegan. He expresses disgust towards the idea that animals are used for food and feels that people are starting to view plant-based foods as "good for your body, good for the environment." Fafara also said that going vegan made a substantial improvement on his health. Fafara is also freemason, citing his interest in charity for the Navajo nation in the American southwest as the driving factor for him to join.

Tattoos

Fafara got his first tattoo at the age of 16. He has a large assortment of tattoos, including a tribal tattoo on his chin, an assortment of Mayan/Aztec tattoos on his chest and left arm, the DevilDriver logo on his upper arm and face, and the Coal Chamber logo on his forearm. He also has a tattoo reading DEZ on his knuckles. in 2019, Fafara extended the tribal tattoo on his chin to extend down his neck and jawline. This new addition featured vibrant colors and a range of Mayan/Aztec styles.

References

External links

 DevilDriver Vocalist Dez Fafara

1966 births
20th-century American male singers
20th-century American singers
21st-century American male singers
21st-century American singers
American heavy metal singers
American musicians of Portuguese descent
American people of Italian descent
Living people
Musicians from California
Nu metal singers
People from Santa Barbara, California